Greater Rochester can refer to

Greater Rochester International Airport, serving Rochester, New York
Rochester, New York metropolitan area
Rochester, Minnesota metropolitan area